Magdolna "Magda" Lenkei (later Linzer, 18 August 1916 – 4 May 1998) was a Hungarian swimmer who won a bronze medal in the 4 × 100 m freestyle relay at the 1931 European Championships. She finished fourth in the relay at the 1936 Summer Olympics and failed to reach the final of the 100 m event.

External links

1916 births
1998 deaths
Olympic swimmers of Hungary
Swimmers at the 1936 Summer Olympics
European Aquatics Championships medalists in swimming
Hungarian female freestyle swimmers
Swimmers from Budapest
20th-century Hungarian women